"Sawage Life" (stylized as "SAWAGE☆LIFE") is a song by Japanese singer songwriter Mai Kuraki, taken from her eleventh studio album Smile (2017). It was released digitally on July 30, 2016, by Northern Music and served as the ending theme to the animation TV program Case Closed. The song was written by Kuraki, Bobby Huff and Alaina Beaton, who is known by her stage name Porcelain Black.

Track listing

Release history

References

2016 singles
2016 songs
Mai Kuraki songs
Songs written by Mai Kuraki
Song recordings produced by Daiko Nagato
Case Closed songs